The T10 Community Cricket League (abbreviated CCL or T10 CCL) is a ten-over cricket tournament conceptualized and broadcast by Caribbean Communications Network (CCN). Launched in Trinidad and Tobago in 2014, it is the first ten-over tournament of its kind to be broadcast on national primetime television. 

The tournament is played in likeness of popular Twenty20 cricket tournaments such as the Indian Premier League (IPL) and Caribbean Premier League (CPL). However, the T10 format involves each team playing an innings consisting of a maximum of 10 overs with individual bowlers allowed a maximum of two overs per innings.

The tournament is open to primarily amateur, community based players, with each team being allowed a semi-professional mentor player. The major role of the mentor player is to provide guidance based on their experience playing at a higher level. This player is limited to batting only 3 overs per game.

Although the T10 format has not gained official accreditation by the International Cricket Council (ICC),the T10 format has spread to other cricketing territories and currently represents the shortest form of the game of cricket.

The inaugural 2014 tournament consisted of 16 teams competing in four groups of four, with the top team from each group going on to contest the semi-finals.

Charlieville SameSide went down in the history books as the first ever T10 champions by capturing the 2014 T10 CCL title.

In 2015, Romel Nanan of the Cane Farm Cougars became the first player to score a century in the tournament.

Champions of the T10 CCL include Charlieville SameSide (2014), ValleyLine Smashers (2015) and Mayaro Mavericks (2016 and 2017).

References

Cricket leagues